Alchemilla hungarica is a plant species of the genus Alchemilla, belonging to the family Rosaceae.

References

hungarica